Mint Hill is an unincorporated community in Osage County, in the U.S. state of Missouri.

History
A post office called Mint Hill was in operation from 1870 until 1954. The community was named for the wild mint near the elevated town site.

References

Unincorporated communities in Osage County, Missouri
Unincorporated communities in Missouri
Jefferson City metropolitan area